Corkery may refer to:

Corkery (surname), a surname
Corkery, Missouri, an extinct town in Missouri, United States
Corkery, Ontario, a community in Ottawa, Canada